List of Dorset Boroughs

The following were historically boroughs in the county of Dorset.

Boroughs, pre-Conquest

Bridport
Dorchester
Shaftesbury
Wareham
Wimborne Minster (see also Lapsed boroughs below)

Boroughs, post-Conquest

Blandford Forum (from 1605)
Corfe Castle (from 1268 or 1576)
Lyme Regis (from 1284 or -85)
Melcombe Regis (from 1268)
Poole (from 1248; a County of itself from 1571)
Sherborne (from 1227)
Weymouth (from 1252)
(Weymouth and Melcombe Regis were joined as a double borough in 1571)

"Lapsed" boroughs 
Castleton (in Oborne)
Charmouth
Newton (in Studland)
Stoborough (in Wareham Holy Trinity)
Whitchurch Canonicorum
Wimborne Minster

Sources
Boswell, Edward, 1833: The Civil Division of the County of Dorset (published on CD by Archive CD Books Ltd, 1992)
Hutchins, John, History of Dorset, vols 1-4 (3rd ed 1861-70; reprinted by EP Publishing, Wakefield, 1973)
Mills, A. D., 1977, 1980, 1989: Place Names of Dorset, parts 1-3. English Place Name Society: Survey of English Place Names vols LII, LIII and 59/60

boroughs
.
Boroughs
Dorset